Tiécoura Traoré is a Malian actor.

Career
In 2006, he was featured as "Chaka" in Abderrahmane Sissako's drama film, Bamako. Other cast include: Aïssa Maïga and Hélène Diarra.

In Daouda Coulibaly's 2010 short film, Tinye So, he was featured as the "Man with traditional clothes".

In 2012, he featured in Dominique Phillipe's film, Tourbillion à Bamako, also featuring Fatoumata Coulibaly, Chek Oumar Sidibé, Mama Koné, Babou Thembely.

Filmography

References

External links
 Tiécoura Traoré on IMDb
 Tiécoura Traoré on BFI
 Tiécoura Traore on Africine
 Tiécoura Traoré on Mubi
 Tiécoura Traoré on New-flix

Living people
Year of birth missing (living people)
Malian actors
21st-century Malian actors